Albert Bentley "Son" Burge (4 June 1889 – 4 January 1943) was an Australian rugby union lock who played with the Souths rugby union club in Sydney and at the age of nineteen was selected for the Australian national team in two Tests against New Zealand in 1907.

Rugby union career
He made the Wallaby tour of Great Britain of 1908, called up as a squad replacement for his brother Peter who broke his leg. Alby appeared in a Test match against Wales. He was sent off for kicking in that match and did not make another rugby international appearance. Despite his sending off, Burge continued to be selected for the invitational matches against club opposition during the tour. Two weeks after the Wales match, Burge was part of the Australian team that faced Cardiff, and was again sent from the pitch by referee Gil Evans after 'brutally' kicking Dai Westacott while the player was prone on the ground.

Rugby league career
'Alby' Burge switched to rugby league football initially joining South Sydney but then in 1911 he joined his brother Frank at Glebe. Albert was the captain of the Glebe side that lost the 1911 New South Wales Rugby League premiership final to Easts and captained the side.

He and his brother Frank, continued to captain Glebe until his retirement after the 1919 NSWRFL season. He also had a brief stint with the North Sydney Bears in 1913.

See also
Burge Family

References

Further reading
 Andrews, Malcolm (2006) The ABC of Rugby League, Austn Broadcasting Corpn, Sydney
 Whiticker, Alan (2004) Captaining the Kangaroos, New Holland, Sydney
 Whiticker, Alan & Hudson, Glen (2006) The Encyclopedia of Rugby League Players, Gavin Allen Publishing, Sydney
 Whiticker, Alan & Collis, Ian (2006) The History of Rugby League Clubs, New Holland, Sydney
 Heads, Ian & Middleton, David (2008) A Centenary of Rugby League, MacMillan, Sydney.
 Howell, Max (2005) Born to Lead: Wallaby Test Captains, Celebrity Books, Auckland, NZ.

                   

1889 births
Australian rugby union players
Australia international rugby union players
Australian rugby league players
Glebe rugby league players
1943 deaths
Albert
Rugby league players from Sydney
North Sydney Bears players
Burials at Eastern Suburbs Memorial Park
Rugby union players from Sydney
Rugby union locks